The 2022 Saturn Oil Open was a professional tennis tournament that was played on clay courts. It was the first edition of the tournament which was part of the 2022 ATP Challenger Tour. It took place in Troisdorf, Germany between 23 and 29 May 2022.

Singles main-draw entrants

Seeds

 1 Rankings are as of 16 May 2022.

Other entrants
The following players received wildcards into the singles main draw:
  Rudolf Molleker
  Henri Squire
  Marko Topo

The following players received entry into the singles main draw as alternates:
  Steven Diez
  Benjamin Hassan
  Julian Lenz
  Daniel Michalski

The following players received entry from the qualifying draw:
  Rémy Bertola
  Andrey Chepelev
  Lucas Gerch
  Lukáš Klein
  Shintaro Mochizuki
  Aldin Šetkić

Champions

Singles

 Lukáš Klein def.  Zizou Bergs 6–2, 6–4.

Doubles

 Dustin Brown /  Evan King def.  Hendrik Jebens /  Piotr Matuszewski 6–4, 7–5.

References

Saturn Oil Open
Saturn Oil Open
May 2022 sports events in Germany
Troisdorf Challenger